Mason Dixon may refer to:
 
Mason–Dixon line separating Delaware and Pennsylvania from Maryland, surveyed 1763–1767
Mason & Dixon, the 1997 novel by Thomas Pynchon featuring the surveyors as characters
Mason and Dixon, Pennsylvania, an unincorporated community
Mason-Dixon Polling & Research Inc., an independent polling firm
Mason Dixon (band), a country music band from the 1980s
Mason Dixon (Rocky Balboa character), a fictional character in the Rocky series

See also